Ruslan Novikov may refer to:

 Ruslan Novikov (footballer) (born 1978), Russian football player
 Ruslan Novikov (weightlifter) (born 1979), Russian weightlifter